Duke Siegfried in Bavaria, full German name: Siegfried August Maximilian Maria, Herzog in Bayern 
(10 July 1876, Bamberg, Kingdom of Bavaria – 12 March 1952, Munich, Republik of Bavaria) was a Duke in Bavaria and member of the House of Wittelsbach. Siegfried August was the first of three sons  of Duke Maximilian Emanuel in Bavaria and his wife Princess Amalie of Saxe-Coburg and Gotha.  Siegfried August was the brother of Christoph Joseph Clemens Maria, Duke in Bavaria and Luitpold Emanuel Ludwig Maria, Duke in Bavaria.

Family and early life 
Duke Siegfried was the eldest son of Duke Maximilian Emanuel in Bavaria and his wife Amalie, who was a sister of Prince Philip of Coburg and of Prince Ferdinand of Bulgaria. Siegfried belonged to the Ducal or non-reigning branch of the ancient dynasty of Wittelsbach, and about five years ago, after having been one of the most conspicuous figures at the Court of Munich, in the Bavarian society, and on the German turf, was halted suddenly in his extravagant career by the old Prince Regent, who insisted upon the disposal of his large and costly racing stables, and upon his betaking himself abroad for the space of a year, one of the objects of his absence from Europe being to break certain feminine entanglements which had become exceedingly troublesome.

The Duke visited America, proceeded via the Pacific to Japan, China and to India, where he shot plenty of big game, and on his way home paid a visit to Archduke Franz Ferdinand, heir apparent to the Austrian throne, at the latter’s country seat in Bohemia in order to compare sporting notes with him, the Archduke likewise having spent a considerable time shooting tigers in India.

Married and unmarried 
While staying with Archduke Franz Ferdinand of Austria, Siegfried met his host’s unmarried half-sister, Archduchess Maria Annunciata, fell in love with her, and their engagement was to be announced in due course. They would have made a comely couple, for the Princess had inherited much of the brilliance as well as good looks of her mother, the beloved Archduchess Maria Theresa, while Duke Siegfried was probably the best looking Prince of his house, a dashing cavalier, and one of the few scions of old world royalty and who had achieved distinction as a steeplechase rider.

Two months later, the engagement was broken off by the Archduchess, owing to her sudden discovery of the stormy antecedents of her fiancé, which she had been ignorant of at the time when she had promised to become his wife. The breaking off of the engagement was a matter which was arranged between the young people themselves, and that they had been deeply in love with each other was shown by the appeal immediately afterward by the Archduchess to the Emperor for permission to enter Holy Orders and to take the vows of a Benedictine nun, while the Duke became prey to melancholia, which in due course developed into insanity, rendering it necessary for his confinement.

Melancholy 
It may be remembered that the origins of the insanity of the Duke’s cousin, King Otto of Bavaria, was due to unfortunate love affair which he took too deeply to heart, and that the first blow to the reason of the late King Ludwig II of Bavaria was given by the Court intrigue which brought about the breaking off of his engagement to his cousin, Duchess Sophie in Bavaria, on the eve of the date appointed for the wedding. King Ludwig, after being placed under restraint as a lunatic, died a violent death in the waters of Lake Starnberg in 1886, while his former fiancée, after a far from happy marriage with the French Duke of Alençon, perished in the flames of the charity bazaar conflagration at Paris in 1897.

Emperor Franz Joseph I of Austria declined to allow his niece to become a nun, pointing out to her that she should be content with her office of Abbess of the Order of Noble Ladies of the Hradschin at Prague, which was a sort of semi-ecclesiastical dignity invariably held by a Princess of the Imperial house. The Lady Abbess of this particular order was the only woman to whom is accorded the right of fulfilling certain Episcopal functions, it being the prerogative of her office to crown the Queen of Bohemia when the Cardinal Archbishop of Prague, crowns the King. Among the insignia of her rank are an Episcopal miter and an Episcopal crozier, and she wore an Episcopal ring of office, which the ladies of the order were required to kiss. But there are no pledges of perpetual celibacy taken in connection with the order. Its members are at liberty to wed at any time they wish, this of course entailing their leaving the order, which was organized for the purpose of providing suitably for the ladies of the nobility who had become impoverished through no fault of their own. All that was required of them was the observance of certain rules, the wearing of a particular costume, and the performance of certain daily religious duties and ceremonies. Each of the members of the order bears the honorary title of “Canoness,’ and the Queen Mother of Spain held the office of Abbess until her marriage to King Alfonso, drawing a stipend as such of $30,000 a year.

Archduchess Maria Annunciata took her religious duties in connection with her office more to heart than any of her predecessors. She considered it to be incumbent upon her to break off her engagement to the Prince.

Died 
Duke Siegfried August in Bavaria died in Munich on 12 March 1952.

Ancestry

References

Bibliography 
 Norbert Nemec: Erzherzogin Maria Annunziata (1876-1961): Die unbekannte Nichte Kaiser Franz Josephs I.,  Böhlau Verlag Wien, 2010, Seiten 92 - 116; Scan from the source
 Heinz Häfner:  Ein König wird beseitigt: Ludwig II. von Bayern, C. H. Beck Verlag, 2011, pp. 213 - 221, ;  Scans from the source
 Damien Bilteryst, Olivier Defrance, Joseph van Loon: Les Biederstein, cousins oubliés de la reine Élisabeth, années 1875-1906. Museum Dynasticum, Bruxelles, XXXIV/1 2022.

External links 
 Wittelsbach Dukes in Bavaria

1876 births
1952 deaths
Dukes in Bavaria
House of Wittelsbach
Nobility from Munich
German Roman Catholics
Members of the Bavarian Reichsrat
Grand Crosses of the Order of Military Merit (Bulgaria)